Zoraspis is a genus of Asaphidae trilobite described from China. The genus contains a single species Zoraspis lobata which was described in 1985 from the Early Ordovician Huangbanjishan Formation in Heilongjiang province.

References

Asaphidae